Zywicki is a surname, originally Żywicki in Polish. Notable people with the surname include:

Jeff Zywicki (born 1981), Canadian lacrosse player
Todd Zywicki (born 1956), American lawyer, legal scholar, and educator

See also
Żywiecki (surname)

Polish-language surnames